The arrondissement of Montreuil is an arrondissement of France in the Pas-de-Calais department in the Hauts-de-France region. It has 164 communes.

Composition

The communes of the arrondissement of Montreuil, and their INSEE codes, are:

 Airon-Notre-Dame (62015)
 Airon-Saint-Vaast (62016)
 Aix-en-Ergny (62017)
 Aix-en-Issart (62018)
 Alette (62021)
 Ambricourt (62026)
 Attin (62044)
 Aubin-Saint-Vaast (62046)
 Auchy-lès-Hesdin(62050)
 Avesnes (62062)
 Avondance (62066)
 Azincourt (62069)
 Béalencourt(62090)
 Beaumerie-Saint-Martin (62094)
 Beaurainville (62100)
 Bécourt (62102)
 Berck (62108)
 Bernieulles (62116)
 Beussent (62123)
 Beutin (62124)
 Bezinghem (62127)
 Bimont (62134)
 Blangy-sur-Ternoise(62138)
 Blingel(62142)
 Boisjean (62150)
 Boubers-lès-Hesmond (62157)
 Bouin-Plumoison (62661)
 Bourthes (62168)
 Brévillers (62175)
 Bréxent-Énocq (62176)
 Brimeux (62177)
 Buire-le-Sec (62183)
 La Calotterie (62196)
 Camiers (62201)
 Campagne-lès-Boulonnais (62202)
 Campagne-lès-Hesdin (62204)
 Campigneulles-les-Grandes (62206)
 Campigneulles-les-Petites (62207)
 Canlers (62209)
 Capelle-lès-Hesdin (62212)
 Caumont (62219)
 Cavron-Saint-Martin (62220)
 Chériennes (62222)
 Clenleu (62227)
 Colline-Beaumont (62231)
 Conchil-le-Temple (62233)
 Contes (62236)
 Cormont (62241)
 Coupelle-Neuve (62246)
 Coupelle-Vieille (62247)
 Crépy (62256)
 Créquy (62257)
 Cucq (62261)
 Douriez (62275)
 Éclimeux(62282)
 Écuires (62289)
 Embry (62293)
 Enquin-sur-Baillons (62296)
 Ergny (62302)
 Estrée (62312)
 Estréelles (62315)
 Étaples (62318)
 Fillièvres (62335)
 Frencq (62354)
 Fresnoy(62357)
 Fressin (62359)
 Fruges (62364)
 Galametz(62365)
 Gouy-Saint-André (62382)
 Grigny(62388)
 Groffliers (62390)
 Guigny (62395)
 Guisy (62398)
 Herly (62437)
 Hesdin (62447)
 Hesmond (62449)
 Hézecques (62453)
 Hubersent (62460)
 Huby-Saint-Leu (62461)
 Hucqueliers (62463)
 Humbert (62466)
 Incourt(62470)
 Inxent (62472)
 Labroye (62481)
 Lebiez (62492)
 Lefaux (62496)
 Lépine (62499)
 Lespinoy (62501)
 La Loge (62521)
 Loison-sur-Créquoise (62522)
 Longvilliers (62527)
 Lugy (62533)
 La Madelaine-sous-Montreuil (62535)
 Maintenay (62538)
 Maisoncelle(62541)
 Maninghem (62545)
 Marant (62547)
 Marconne (62549)
 Marconnelle (62550)
 Marenla (62551)
 Maresquel-Ecquemicourt (62552)
 Maresville (62554)
 Marles-sur-Canche (62556)
 Matringhem (62562)
 Mencas (62565)
 Merlimont (62571)
 Montcavrel (62585)
 Montreuil (62588)
 Mouriez (62596)
 Nempont-Saint-Firmin (62602)
 Neulette(62605)
 Neuville-sous-Montreuil (62610)
 Noyelles-lès-Humières  (62625)
 Offin (62635)
 Le Parcq (62647)
 Parenty (62648)
 Planques (62659)
 Preures (62670)
 Le Quesnoy-en-Artois (62677)
 Quilen (62682)
 Radinghem (62685)
 Rang-du-Fliers (62688)
 Raye-sur-Authie (62690)
 Recques-sur-Course (62698)
 Regnauville (62700)
 Rimboval (62710)
 Rollancourt(62719)
 Roussent (62723)
 Royon (62725)
 Ruisseauville (62726)
 Rumilly (62729)
 Sains-lès-Fressin (62738)
 Saint-Aubin (62742)
 Saint-Denœux (62745)
 Sainte-Austreberthe (62743)
 Saint-Georges (62749)
 Saint-Josse (62752)
 Saint-Michel-sous-Bois (62762)
 Saint-Rémy-au-Bois (62768)
 Saulchoy (62783)
 Sempy (62787)
 Senlis (62790)
 Sorrus (62799)
 Tigny-Noyelle (62815)
 Torcy (62823)
 Tortefontaine (62824)
 Le Touquet-Paris-Plage (62826)
 Tramecourt (62828)
 Tubersent (62832)
 Vacqueriette-Erquières (62834)
 Verchin (62843)
 Verchocq (62844)
 Verton (62849)
 Vieil-Hesdin (62850)
 Vincly (62862)
 Waben (62866)
 Wail (62868)
 Wailly-Beaucamp (62870)
 Wambercourt (62871)
 Wamin (62872)
 Wicquinghem (62886)
 Widehem (62887)
 Willeman(62890)
 Zoteux (62903)

History

The arrondissement of Montreuil was created in 1800. In January 2007 it absorbed the canton of Le Parcq from the arrondissement of Arras.

As a result of the reorganisation of the cantons of France which came into effect in 2015, the borders of the cantons are no longer related to the borders of the arrondissements. The cantons of the arrondissement of Montreuil were, as of January 2015:

 Berck
 Campagne-lès-Hesdin
 Étaples
 Fruges
 Hesdin
 Hucqueliers
 Montreuil
 Le Parcq

References

Montreuil